Mansur Ismail (born 15 January 1994; popularly known as Mansur Makeup) is a Nigerian makeup artist film producer and film actor from Northern Nigeria's movie industry, known as Kannywood.

Early life and education 

Mansur was born in the Kabalan Doki, Kaduna City on 15 January 1994. He attended both primary and secondary schools in Kaduna, and he studied Art at University of Jos, Plateau State.

Career 
Mansur started his makeup artist in 2007 on the advice of his friend, who is also a filmmaker, to join the Kannywood industry. Mansur then got involved in Makeup and worked in Makeup in some of the biggest films of the Kannywood industry.

References 

1994 births
Nigerian male film actors
Hausa-language mass media
Living people
People from Kaduna
Male actors in Hausa cinema
21st-century Nigerian male actors
University of Jos alumni
Nigerian male television actors
Hausa people